This is a list of Croatian television related events from 2006.

Events
15 December - Danijel Rimanić wins season 3 of Big Brother.

Debuts
2 December - Ples sa zvijezdama (2006-2013)

Television shows

2000s
Big Brother (2004-2008, 2016–present)
Zabranjena ljubav (2004-2008)

Ending this year

Births

Deaths